A special election was held in  on March 23, 1801 to fill a vacancy left by the death of James Jones on January 11, 1801, before the start of the 7th Congress.  His death had also left a vacancy in the 6th Congress, which went unfilled.

Election results

Milledge took his seat at the start of the 1st session of the 7th Congress, on December 7, 1801.  Milledge had served earlier, in the 4th and 5th Congresses.  Milledge himself would subsequently resign in May, 1802, upon being elected Governor of Georgia

See also
List of special elections to the United States House of Representatives

References

Georgia 1801 At-large
Georgia 1801 At-large
1801 At-large
Georgia At-large
1801 Georgia (U.S. state) elections
United States House of Representatives 1801 at-large